Jorge Antunes may refer to:
 Jorge Antunes (actor), Angolan actor
 Jorge Antunes (composer) (born 1942), Brazilian composer